Martin Howald is a Swiss orienteering competitor. He participated at the 1985 World Orienteering Championships in Bendigo, where he won a bronze medal in the relay, together with Willi Müller, Urs Flühmann and Alain Gafner. At the 1981 World Orienteering Championships he placed 9th in the individual contest, and fifth with the Swiss relay team.

References

Year of birth missing (living people)
Living people
Swiss orienteers
Male orienteers
Foot orienteers
World Orienteering Championships medalists